Wendy Rae Fowler is an American singer and half of the experimental English rock band We Fell to Earth.

Career
In fall of 1998, Fowler joined Earthlings? as second bassist.  Immediately following, Earthlings? supported Queens of the Stone Age on a small tour of the west coast of America as well as a European tour supporting QOTSA's self-titled debut album.

Fowler, under the QOTSA-appointed pseudonym 'Wendy Ray Moan', contributed backing vocals on two songs on QOTSA's second release Rated R.  She has also appeared in four of the bands' videos between 2000 and 2007.

Work with Earthlings? and QOTSA led to meeting singer/songwriter Mark Lanegan in 1998 which resulted in collaborations on Lanegan's Field Songs and Bubblegum, as well as their marriage and eventual divorce.

In 2005, Fowler met Richard File (UNKLE, We Fell to Earth) at a social gathering in LA while UNKLE were in town recording their 4th album War Stories. The pair decided to schedule a writing session after an initial conversation revealed they had very similar influences.  That first session would mark the birth of We Fell to Earth.

Alongside their debut 2009 self-titled release, tracks by the group have been featured in US dramas:
"The Double" in Gossip Girl and CSI: NY and The Prisoner
"Lights Out" In Numb3rs
"Careful What You Wish For" in CSI: NY.

In the winter of 2010, the group composed the theme song to AMC'S The Killing from writer, executive producer, and series showrunner, Veena Sud. The show is based on the Danish television series Forbrydelsen and tells the story of the murder of a young girl in Seattle and the subsequent police investigation. The show debuted with a 2 hour premiere on Sunday, April 3, 2011.

Fowler has made various appearances on American film and TV From 1996–2007. One notable appearance was as the lead female dancer in Finger Eleven's video for "Paralyzer".

Discography

Albums
We Fell to Earth (2009)

Singles and EPs
We Fell to Earth EP (2009)
"Lights Out"
"The Double"
"Deaf"

Cameos
(all vocals except *piano and **drums)

Queens of the Stone Age – Rated R (2000) "Feel Good Hit of the Summer" and "Quick and to the Pointless"

Mark Lanegan – Field Songs (2001) "No Easy Action"

Mark Lanegan Band – Bubblegum (2004) *"When Your Number Isn't Up", "Wedding Dress", "Methamphetamine Blues", "Bombed", "Strange Religion",

Eagles of Death Metal – Death by Sexy (2006) "I Like to Move in the Night", "The Ballad of Queen Bee and Baby Duck", and "Poor Doggie"

The Duke Spirit – Neptune (2008) **"The Step and the Walk/Rich File Remix"

Yawning Sons – Ceremony to the Sunset (2009) "Ghostship – Dead Water"

UNKLE – Where Did the Night Fall (2011) "Money and Run" (feat. Nick Cave)

Maya Jane Coles - Take Flight (2017) "A Chemical Affair" and "Misty Morning"

References

External links
 Discography
 http://www.artistdirect.com/artist/wendy-rae-fowler/3617447
 Official Website

American experimental musicians
Year of birth missing (living people)
Living people